Dzhangil'dino (Jangeldın, جانگەلدين; , Dzhangil'dino) is a town in Atyrau Region, southwest Kazakhstan.

References

Atyrau Region
Cities and towns in Kazakhstan